Stanley Lloyd Miller (March 7, 1930 – May 20, 2007) was an American chemist who made landmark experiments in the origin of life by demonstrating that a wide range of vital  organic compounds can be synthesized by fairly simple chemical processes from inorganic substances. In 1952 he carried out the Miller–Urey experiment, which showed that complex organic molecules could be synthesised from inorganic precursors.  The experiment was widely reported, and provided support for the idea that the chemical evolution of the early Earth had led to the natural synthesis of chemical building blocks of life from inanimate inorganic molecules. He has been described as the "father of prebiotic chemistry".

Life and career

Stanley Miller was born in Oakland, California. He was the second child (after a brother, Donald) of Nathan and Edith Miller, descendants of Jewish immigrants from Belarus and Latvia. His father was an attorney and held the office of the Oakland Deputy District Attorney in 1927. His mother was a school teacher so that education was quite a natural environment in the family. In fact, while in Oakland High School he was nicknamed "a chem whiz". He followed his brother to the University of California at Berkeley to study chemistry mainly because he felt that Donald would be able to help him on the subject. He completed his BSC in June 1951. For graduation course, he faced financial problems, as his father died in 1946 leaving the family with a money shortage. Fortunately with the help from Berkeley faculty (UC Berkeley did not then have assistantships), he was offered a teaching assistantship at the University of Chicago in February 1951, which could provide the basic funds for graduate work. He joined this post and got registered for a PhD program in September. He frantically searched for a thesis topic to work on, meeting one professor after another, and he was inclined toward theoretical problems as experiments tended to be laborious. He was initially convinced to work with the theoretical physicist Edward Teller on synthesis of elements. Following the customs  of the university, where a graduate student is obliged to attend seminars, he attended a chemistry seminar in which the Nobel laureate Harold Urey gave a lecture on the origin of solar system and how organic synthesis could be possible under reducing environment such as the primitive Earth's atmosphere. Miller was immensely inspired. After a year of fruitless work with Teller, and the prospect of Teller leaving Chicago to work on the Hydrogen bomb, Miller was prompted to approach Urey in September 1952 for a fresh research project. Urey was not immediately enthusiastic on Miller's interest in pre-biotic synthesis, as no successful works had been done, and he even suggested working on thallium in meteorites. With persistence Miller persuaded Urey to pursue electric discharges in gases. He found clear evidence for the production of amino acids in the reaction vessel.  He was always afraid that some specks of fly excrement might be the source of the amino acids he discovered in the reaction tube (or was so chided by his classmates). This was not the case and the result was a clear demonstration that a host of "organic" chemical compounds could be produced by purely inorganic processes. Miller eventually earned his doctorate degree in 1954, and a long-lasting reputation. From spectroscopic observations on stars, it is now well known that complex organic compounds are formed in the gases blown off of carbon rich stars as a result of chemical reactions. The fundamental issue of what the connection was between the "pre-biotic organic" compounds and the origin of life has remained.

After completing a doctorate, Miller moved to the California Institute of Technology as a F. B. Jewett Fellow in 1954 and 1955. Here he worked on the mechanism involved in the amino and hydroxycarboxylic acid synthesis. He then joined the Department of Biochemistry at the College of Physicians and Surgeons, Columbia University, New York, where he worked for the next five years. When the new University of California at San Diego was established, he became the first assistant professor in the Department of Chemistry in 1960, and an associate professor in 1962, and then a full Professor in 1968.

He supervised 8 PhD students including Jeffrey L. Bada.

Miller's experiment

The Miller experiment appeared in his technical paper in the 15 May 1953 issue of Science, which transformed the concept of scientific ideas on the origin of life into a respectable realm of empirical inquiry. His study has become a classic textbook definition of the scientific basis of origin of life, or more specifically, the first definitive experimental evidence of the Oparin-Haldane's "primordial soup" theory. Urey and Miller designed to simulate the ocean-atmospheric condition of the primitive Earth by using a continuous run of steam into a mixture of methane (CH4), ammonia (NH3), and hydrogen (H2). The gaseous mixture was then exposed to electrical discharge, which induced chemical reaction.  After a week of reaction, Miller detected the formation of amino acids, such as glycine, α- and β-alanine, using paper chromatography. He also detected aspartic acid and gamma-amino butyric acid, but was not confident because of the weak spots. Since amino acids are the basic structural and functional constituents of cellular life, the experiment showed the possibility of natural organic synthesis for the origin of life on earth.

Publication problem

Miller showed his results to Urey, who suggested immediate publication. Urey declined to be the co-author lest Miller receive little or no credit. The manuscript with Miller as the sole author was submitted to Science on 10 February 1953. After weeks of silence, Urey inquired and wrote to the chair of the editorial board on 27 February on the lack of action in reviewing the manuscript. A month passed, but still there was no decision. On 10 March the infuriated Urey demanded the manuscript to be returned, and he himself submitted it to the Journal of the American Chemical Society on 13 March. By then, the editor of Science, apparently annoyed by Urey's insinuation, wrote directly to Miller that the manuscript was to be published. Miller accepted it and withdrew the manuscript from the Journal of the American Chemical Society.

Follow-up

Miller continued his research until his death in 2007. As the knowledge on early atmosphere progressed, and techniques for chemical analyses advanced, he kept on refining the details and methods. He not only succeeded in synthesizing more and more varieties of amino acids, he also produced a wide variety of inorganic and organic compounds essential for cellular construction and metabolism. In support, a number of independent researchers also confirmed the range of chemical syntheses. With the most recent revelation that, unlike the original Miller's experimental hypothesis of strongly reducing condition, the primitive atmosphere could be quite neutral containing other gases in different proportions, Miller's last works, posthumously published in 2008, still succeeded in synthesizing an array of organic compounds using such condition.

Reassessment

In 1972 Miller and his collaborators repeated the 1953 experiment, but with newly developed automatic chemical analysers, such as ion-exchange chromatography and gas chromatography-mass spectrometry. They synthesized 33 amino acids, including 10 that are known to naturally occur in organisms. These included all of the primary alpha-amino acids found in the Murchison meteorite, which fell on Australia in 1969. Subsequent electric discharge experiment actually produced more variety of amino acids than that in the meteorite.

Just before Miller's death, several boxes containing vials of dried residues were found among his laboratory materials at the university. The note indicated that some were from his original 1952-1954 experiments, produced by using three different apparatuses, and one from 1958, which included H2S in the gaseous mixture for the first time and the result never published. In 2008 his students re-analysed the 1952 samples using more sensitive techniques, such as high-performance liquid chromatography and liquid chromatography–time of flight
mass spectrometry. Their result showed the synthesis of 22 amino acids and 5 amines, revealing that the original Miller experiment produced many more compounds than actually reported in 1953. The unreported 1958 samples were analysed in 2011, from which 23 amino acids and 4 amines, including 7 sulfurous compounds, were detected.

Death

Miller suffered a series of strokes beginning in November 1999 that increasingly inhibited his physical activity. He was living in a nursing home in National City, south of San Diego, and died on 20 May 2007 at the nearby Paradise Hospital. He is survived by his brother Donald and his family, and his devoted partner Maria Morris.

Honours and recognitions

Miller is remembered for his seminal works in the origin of life (and he was considered a pioneer in the field of exobiology), the natural occurrence of clathrate hydrates, and general mechanisms of action of anaesthesia. He was elected to the US National Academy of Sciences in 1973. He was an Honorary Counselor of the Higher Council for Scientific Research of Spain in 1973. He was awarded the Oparin Medal by the International Society for the Study of the Origin of Life in 1983, and served as its president from 1986 to 1989.

He was nominated for Nobel Prize more than once in his life.

Stanley L. Miller Award for young scientists under the age of 37 was instituted by the International Society for the Study of the Origin of Life in 2008.

See also 
 Abiogenesis
 Alexander Oparin
 Biochemistry
 Microsphere
 Proteinoid
 Sidney W. Fox
 Antonio Lazcano

References

External links

'Lost' Miller-Urey experiment created more of life's building blocks
Biography at Encyclopædia Britannica
Stanley Miller Papers MSS 642. Special Collections & Archives, UC San Diego Library.

20th-century American chemists
American biologists
University of California, San Diego faculty
University of Chicago alumni
1930 births
2007 deaths
American people of Belarusian-Jewish descent
American people of Latvian-Jewish descent
Members of the United States National Academy of Sciences
University of California, Berkeley alumni
Origin of life
20th-century biologists